The Aberdeen Independent was a free newspaper delivered to houses in the Aberdeen area. Despite the name, it was not connected to the nationally available Independent.

The paper published for 12 years and was named best free newspaper eight times by the Scottish Newspaper Society. The newspaper closed in June 2008, leaving the Aberdeen Citizen as the city's only free newspaper.

References

External links
External
 Aberdeen Independent

Newspapers published in Scotland
Mass media in Aberdeen
2008 disestablishments in Scotland